The 2005–06 Coupe de la Ligue, a knockout cup competition in French football organised by the Ligue de Football Professionnel, began on 20 September 2005. The final was held on 22 April 2006 at the Stade de France. AS Nancy defeated Nice 2–1 in the final. The defending champions RC Strasbourg were eliminated from the competition on 26 October 2005 by SM Caen.

First round

Second round

Third round
 21 December 2005 Toulouse FC  2–0 Paris Saint-Germain
 21 December 2005 Montpellier HSC 0–1 AC Ajaccio
 21 December 2005 AS Nancy Lorraine 1–0 FC Lorient
 21 December 2005 AS Monaco 1–0   LOSC
 21 December 2005 AJ Auxerre 1–1 a.e.t. (1–4 pens) Le Mans UC 72
 20 December 2005 EA Guingamp 2–0 SM Caen
 20 December 2005 OGC Nice 2–0 CS Sedan
 20 December 2005 FC Girondins de Bordeaux  3–1 FC Nantes

Final draw

Final draw results

Quarter-finals

Semi-finals

Final

Topscorer
Arnaud Gonzalez (3 goals)

External links
Coupe de La Ligue Ligue de Football Professionnel 

Coupe de la Ligue seasons
France
League Cup